Allister Bain (born 1 January 1935) is a Grenadian television and film actor and theatre playwright and screenwriter, who moved to the UK in 1958. A veteran of British performing arts, his TV appearances include roles in Us Girls, Vanity Fair, Bugs, Doctor Who and Waking the Dead. On the stage Bain has appeared in plays by Derek Walcott, Earl Lovelace, Michael Abbensetts, Noël Coward, and William Shakespeare, among many others.

Biography
Bain was born in 1935 in the sovereign state and island country of Grenada, located north-west of Trinidad and Tobago, north-east of Venezuela, and south-west of Saint Vincent and the Grenadines in the Caribbean. In 1958, Allister moved to England, having taught Dorothy Dandridge to limbo for the film Island in the Sun (1957).

Sometime before the start of his career, Bain was in charge of his own dance troupe, the Bee Wee Ballet of Grenada, whose performances were some of the first that contributed to the birth of what became the Notting Hill Carnival. Bain has written a number of plays during his career. His first, 2001 People, was written in 2001. His play Effie May debuted in 2005 when Bain was 70 years old, Catalysta in 2008, and Pardon My Simplicity in January 2012 (Rosemary Branch Theatre). He is also the author of One Slice of History (Good Vibes Records & Music Ltd, December 2012).

Filmography

References

External links

1935 births
Black British male actors
English dramatists and playwrights
English male dramatists and playwrights
English male film actors
English male screenwriters
English male television actors
English screenwriters
Grenadian actors
Grenadian emigrants to the United Kingdom
Living people